Carlos Augusto Bertoldi (born February 7, 1985, in Curitiba), known simply as Ticão, is a Brazilian professional footballer who is currently a free agent.

Statistics

Club career
 As of 19 December 2016, table only shows statistics in Hong Kong.

Honours
Club Athlético Paranaense
Paraná State League: 2005
Sport Club do Recife
Pernambuco State League: 2006, 2007.

Fortaleza Esporte Clube
Ceará State League: 2010.

Yuen Long
Hong Kong Senior Shield: 2017–18

Contract
Náutico (Loan) 1 January 2008 to 31 December 2008
Atlético-PR 1 January 2008 to 1 January 2010

References

External links

1985 births
Living people
Brazilian footballers
Association football midfielders
Club Athletico Paranaense players
Sport Club do Recife players
Clube Náutico Capibaribe players
Ituano FC players
Olympiacos Volos F.C. players
Brazilian expatriate footballers
Expatriate footballers in Greece
Expatriate footballers in Hong Kong
Footballers from Curitiba
South China AA players
Yuen Long FC players
Southern District FC players
Hong Kong Premier League players
Hong Kong League XI representative players